Will Corrie (14 January 1867 - 1950)  was a British actor of the silent era.

Selected filmography
 Hard Times (1915)
 The Laughing Cavalier (1917)
 The Manxman (1917)
 Tom Jones (1917)
 Dombey and Son (1917)
 The Romance of Lady Hamilton (1919)
 The March Hare (1919)
 I Will (1919)
 Fancy Dress (1919)
 The Breed of the Treshams (1920)
 A Bachelor Husband (1920)
 The Amateur Gentleman (1920)
 The Headmaster (1921)
 Cherry Ripe (1921)
 The Street of Adventure (1921)

References

External links

Year of birth unknown
Year of death unknown
British male silent film actors
20th-century British male actors
Place of birth missing
1867 births